Nowa Karczma  is a village in Kościerzyna County, Pomeranian Voivodeship, in northern Poland. It is the seat of the gmina (administrative district) called Gmina Nowa Karczma.

For details of the history of the region, see History of Pomerania.

The village has a population of 989.

References

Villages in Kościerzyna County